HD 197037 is a binary star system. Its primary or visible star, HD 197037A, is a F-type main-sequence star. Its surface temperature is 6150 K. HD 197037A is depleted in heavy elements compared to the Sun, with a metallicity Fe/H index of −0.16, but is younger at an age of 3.408 billion years.

A multiplicity survey detected a red dwarf stellar companion HD 197037B in 2016, at a projected separation of 121 AU. The existence of other stellar companions at projected separations from 1.62 to 45.26 AU was excluded.

Planetary system
In 2012 one planet, named HD 197037 A b, was discovered on a wide, eccentric orbit by the radial velocity method.

Another planet in the system was initially suspected, but the radial velocity signal was later attributed to the stellar companion HD 197037B.

References

Cygnus (constellation)
Planetary transit variables
F-type main-sequence stars
Planetary systems with one confirmed planet
J20393296+4214549
BD+41 3845
101948
197037
Binary stars
M-type main-sequence stars